Gokana (Gòkánà) is an Ogoni language spoken by some 130,000 people in Rivers State, Nigeria.

Phonology
Gokana has been argued to lack syllables, a radical claim because syllables are traditionally considered to be universal. According to Hyman (1983), Gokana "does not organise its consonants and vowels into syllables." Hyman later amended his claim to say that "the syllable plays at best a minor role in the prosodic organisation of Gokana" and is perhaps not activated to express any generalisations in the language.

Writing system

Nasal vowels are indicated by a tilde and tones are indicated by an acute or grave accent:
 The high tone is indicated by an acute accent : á, ã́, é, ẹ́, ẽ́, í, ĩ́, ó, ọ́, ṍ, ú, ṹ, ḿ ;
 The low tone is indicated by a grave accent  : à, ã̀, è, ẹ̀, ẽ̀, ì, ĩ̀, ò, ọ̀, õ̀, ù, ũ̀, m̀ ;
 The middle tone is indicated with no diacritic.

References

"A global linguistic database:Gokana" Tower of Babel Project
Brosnahan, L. F. (1964) "Outlines of the Phonology of the Gokana Dialect of Ogoni" Journal of West African Languages 1(1): pp. 43–48
Brosnahan, L. F. (1967) "A Word List of the Gokana Dialect of Ogoni" Journal of West African Languages 4(2): pp. 43–52
Hyman, Larry M. and Comrie, B. (1981) "Logophoric Reference in Gokana" Journal of African Languages and Linguistics (Leiden) 3(1):  pp. 19–37
Hyman, Larry M. (1982) "The representation of nasality in Gokana" In Hulst, Harry, van der and Smith, Norval (eds.) (1982) The Structure of Phonological Representations part, 1 Foris Publishing, Dordrecht, Holland, 
Yan Huang (2003) "Switch-reference in Amele and logophoric verbal suffix in Gokana: a generalized neo-Gricean pragmatic analysis" In Georgiafentis, M.;  Haeberli, E, and Varlokosta, S. (eds.) (2003) Reading Working Papers in Linguistics Volume 7, pp. 53–76, School of Linguistics and Applied Language Studies, University of Reading, Reading, UK
Bond, Oliver and Anderson, Gregory D. S. (2005) "Divergent Structure in Ogonoid Languages" In (2005) Proceedings of the Berkeley Linguistic Society Volume 31, Berkeley Linguistic Society, Berkeley, California

Indigenous languages of Rivers State
Ogoni languages